Pae may refer to:

Places
 Pae River, former name of the Taedong River in Pyongyang, Korea
 Pae, Tallinn, subdistrict of Lasnamäe District, Tallinn, Estonia
 Pae, Padise Parish, village in Padise Parish, Harju County, Estonia
 Pae, Rapla County, village in Kehtna Parish, Rapla County, Estonia

People

 Yustinus Pae (born 1983), Indonesian footballer
 Pae Gil-su (born 1972), North Korean gymnast 
 Mark Pae (born 1926), Anglican bishop
 Pae Tal-jun (born 1972), North Korean politician

Other uses
 Pae,  a genus of wasps in the family Crabronidae
 PAE (Pacific Architects and Engineers), a company owned by Platinum Investment Group.
 PAE, the IATA code for Paine Field, a commercial airport in suburban Seattle, United States
 PAE (Prostatic artery embolization), a medical procedure

See also